Masseduction is the fifth studio album by American musician St. Vincent, released on October 13, 2017, through Loma Vista Recordings. The album peaked at number 10 on the Billboard 200, becoming her first top ten album in the United States. The album also received universal acclaim and was the fourth-most mentioned in critics' year-end lists for 2017. At the 61st Annual Grammy Awards, Masseduction won the award for Best Recording Package and Best Rock Song for its title track, and was also nominated for the Best Alternative Music Album.

Release and promotion
"New York" was released as the lead single from the album on June 30, 2017. The album was announced on September 6 along with a pre-order and the release of the second single, "Los Ageless". The announcement was followed by a series of cryptic, satirical promotional clips Clark (St. Vincent) posted to her social media. Clark hosted a press conference on Facebook Live to announce the album, which was in the style of the sarcastic earlier clips. "Pills" was released as the third single on October 10. The album was promoted on two different tours: the Fear the Future Tour saw St. Vincent performing solo to prerecorded tracks in theatres, while the I Am a Lot Like You! Tour saw her performing with her band mostly in festivals around the world.

Recording
The album was produced by Clark and Jack Antonoff at Electric Lady Studios in Manhattan, with additional recording at Rough Consumer Studio in Brooklyn, and Compound Fracture in Los Angeles. It features contributions from Doveman on piano, Kamasi Washington on saxophone, Jenny Lewis on guest vocals, and beat production from Sounwave, as well as pedal steel by Greg Leisz and Rich Hinman, and additional guitar and vocals from her uncle and aunt Tuck & Patti, respectively. Model and actress Cara Delevingne, whom Clark had dated before they split in 2016, provided back-up vocals.

Music and lyrics
Masseduction has been described as the "culmination of years of writing, with songs crafted from voice memos, text messages, and snippets of melodies that came to Clark while traveling the globe." Clark has stated that the album focuses on themes of power, sex, drugs, sadness, imperiled relationships and death. In a press release, she stated: "every record I make has an archetype. Strange Mercy was Housewives on Pills. St. Vincent was Near-Future Cult Leader. Masseduction is different, it's pretty first person. You can't fact-check it, but if you want to know about my life, listen to this record."

Musically, the album has been characterized as "futuristic" pop, electropop, glam rock and new wave, while also incorporating ambient rock, "industrial-tinted techno", psychedelic rock, electronic rock and dream pop. It consists of guitar and piano, synths and strings, and drum beats "that punch with purpose".

Critical reception

At Metacritic, which assigns a normalized rating out of 100 to reviews from mainstream publications, the album received an average score of 88, based on 38 reviews, indicating "universal acclaim". According to the site, the album was the fourth-most mentioned in critics' year-end lists for 2017. John Murphy of musicOMH praised the album, saying "it's clear that Clark has not only raised the bar but moved it several notches up. Masseduction is a remarkable record, a certain contender for album of the year and demonstrable proof that Clark is an artist working at the height of her powers," continuing: "Masseduction is nothing less than an absolutely towering achievement. A year after we all mourned the loss of creative geniuses like David Bowie and Prince, we should be thankful that one of their spiritual successors in Annie Clark is on fine form."

El Hunt of DIY wrote, "Along with the equally exceptional St. Vincent which came before it, this is the moment that St. Vincent enters the fabled realm reserved for the greats." Claire Biddles of The Line of Best Fit stated that "ultimately, Masseduction defies explanation and critique, rendering the critic a dead weight in the dust of its ever-accelerating sucker-punch of ideas." Drowned in Sounds Jude Clarke said, "You wouldn't want one track or note to be changed or left out. It's a genuine masterpiece: complex, funny, sexy, bleak, uplifting, inspiring and enthralling from start to finish." AllMusic critic Heather Phares said "Masseduction delivers sketches of chaos with stunning clarity. It's the work of an always savvy artist at her wittiest and saddest." The A.V. Clubs Annie Zaleski wrote that Clark "perfects her fractured, futuristic pop vision on Masseduction" and that she "captures this emotional roller-coaster in her remarkably genre-agnostic music".

The record made many appearances on best of the decades list. Uproxx listed Masseduction as the 14th best pop album of the 2010s.

Accolades
Masseduction appeared on multiple year-end lists in 2017.

Commercial performance
In the United States, Masseduction debuted at number 10 on the Billboard 200, becoming St. Vincent's first album to peak in the top ten of the chart. It sold 29,000 units in its first week, 25,000 of which were in traditional album sales. The album debuted at number six in the UK, selling 7,610 copies including streaming.

Track listing
Credits adapted from the album's liner notes.

All songs written by Annie Clark, except where noted.

 Masseduction

Personnel
Credits adapted from the liner notes of Masseduction.

Musicians

 Annie Clark – guitar , vocals , synthesizers , bass 
 Tuck Andress – guitar 
 Patti Andress – vocals 
 Jenny Lewis – vocals 
 Kid Monkey – vocals 
 Toko Yasuda – vocals 
 Jack Antonoff – synthesizers , programming , bass , drums , string arrangements , mellotron , piano 
 Daniel Mintseris – synthesizers 
 Lars Stalfors – synthesizers , programming 
 Sounwave – programming 
 Adam Pickrell – programming 
 Thomas Bartlett – piano , synthesizers 
 Bobby Sparks – keyboards 
 Mike Elizondo – bass 
 Pino Palladino – bass 
 Greg Leisz – pedal steel 
 Rich Hinman – pedal steel 
 Evan Smith – saxophone 
 Kamasi Washington – saxophone 
 Margot – strings 
 Philip A. Peterson – cello 
 Timothy Garland – violin

Technical

 Jack Antonoff – production, additional engineering
 St. Vincent – production, additional engineering
 Lars Stalfors – co-production 
 Laura Sisk – engineering
 Sean Cook – additional engineering
 John Congleton – additional production 
 Brent Arrowood – additional engineering 
 Alonzo Lazaro – additional engineering 
 Miro Mackie – additional engineering 
 Tom Elmhirst – mixing 
 Catherine Marks – mixing 
 Brandon Boost – mix engineering 
 Caesar Edmunds – mix engineering 
 Chris Gehringer – mastering

Artwork
 Willo Perron & Associates – creative direction
 NONOT – package design
 Nedda Afsari – photography

Charts

MassEducation

MassEducation is an acoustic reworking of Masseduction, released on October 12, 2018 by Loma Vista Recordings. It was recorded with pianist Thomas Bartlett over two days during mixing sessions of Masseduction, and features sparse piano-driven renditions of the album's songs. It was promoted by a reworking of "Slow Disco" entitled "Slow Slow Disco".

Track listing
All songs written by Annie Clark, except where noted. All tracks are noted as "piano version".

Personnel
 Annie Clark – vocals, production
 Thomas Bartlett – piano, production
 Pat Dillett – recording, mixing
 Chris Gehringer – mastering
 Greg Leisz – pedal steel
 Pamela Neal – photography
 Carrie Smith – package design

Charts

Nina Kraviz Presents Masseduction Rewired

Nina Kraviz Presents Masseduction Rewired is a remix album curated by Russian DJ Nina Kraviz. It features remixes of Masseduction tracks from a variety of producers including Jlin, Laurel Halo, Population One, Midland, Pearson Sound and Kraviz. It was released by Loma Vista on December 13, 2019.

Track listing

Notes

References

2017 albums
Albums produced by Jack Antonoff
Albums produced by John Congleton
Albums produced by Lars Stalfors
Albums produced by St. Vincent (musician)
Albums recorded at Electric Lady Studios
Glam rock albums by American artists
New wave albums by American artists
Loma Vista Recordings albums
St. Vincent (musician) albums